Konthoujam is a Meitei ethnic family name (surname). Notable people with this family name are:
 Govindas Konthoujam, Indian politician
 Konthoujam Tampha Lairembi, a princess that turned into a goddess in Meitei mythology
 Khonthoujam Boboi Singh, Indian footballer

See also 
 Konthoujam (disambiguation)